John Frawley may refer to:

 John Frawley (tennis) (born 1965), retired Australian tennis player
 John Frawley (actor) (died 1999), Australian actor
 John Frawley (astrologer) (born 1955), English astrologer, writer and educator